Richard Reynell (c.1681–1734) of East Ogwell and Denbury, near Ashburton, Devon was an English landowner and Tory politician who sat in the English House of Commons from 1702 to 1708 and in the British House of Commons from 1711 to 1734.

Early life
Reynell was the third, but eldest surviving, son of  Thomas Reynell of East Ogwell and his second wife Elizabeth Gould, daughter of James Gould, merchant, of Exeter, Devon and London. His father had sat in the   parliaments during The Protectorate and was a patron of the Dissenters within the town.  Reynell  succeeded to the estates of his father in 1698.

Career
At the 1702 general election, Reynell was returned unopposed as  Member of Parliament for Ashburton. He was a moderate Tory and was generally active in parliament. After being elected in a contest at the 1705 general election, he was listed as ‘Low Church’ and voted against the Court candidate for Speaker. He was defeated at the 1708 general election and again in the poll at Ashburton again at the 1710 general election. However, he was seated on petition on 17 March 1711. He was listed among the ‘worthy patriots’ but later in the Parliament appeared to be a ‘whimsical’ Tory, showing a sympathy with dissent. He was elected again for Ashburton in 1713. At the 1715 general election he was returned unopposed for Ashburton. He was classified as a Whig, but in fact, he opposed the administration in all subsequent votes. He was returned unopposed again at the 1722 general election . In 1727  he faced an contest and was elected successfully. However, he was defeated in the  1734 general election.

Death and legacy
Reynell died in June 1735 at East Ogwell and was buried there on 14 June. The beneficiary of his will was his niece  Rebecca Whitrow, the wife of Joseph Taylor. Reynell had instructed that his estates be sold for her benefit, but her husband then purchased them as the absolute estate of inheritance, which he settled on his wife and son.

References

.

1680s births
1735 deaths
Members of the Parliament of England for Ashburton
English MPs 1705–1707
British MPs 1710–1713
British MPs 1713–1715
British MPs 1715–1722
British MPs 1722–1727
British MPs 1727–1734
Members of the Parliament of Great Britain for Ashburton